Beratha Jeeva is a 1965 Indian Kannada-language film, directed by K. R. Seetharama Sastry and produced by K. R. Seetharama Sastry and Shivaram. The film stars Kalyan Kumar, B. Saroja Devi, Jayanthi and K. S. Ashwath. The movie is a remake of the 1961 Tamil movie Palum Pazhamum.

Cast

Soundtrack
The music was composed by Vijaya Bhaskar.

References

1965 films
1960s Kannada-language films
Kannada remakes of Tamil films
Films directed by K. R. Seetharama Sastry